Błotnia  is a village in the administrative district of Gmina Pszczew, within Międzyrzecz County, Lubusz Voivodeship, in western Poland. Between 1975 and 1998 it belonged administratively to the province of Gdańsk.

References

Villages in Międzyrzecz County